William Ernest Stevenson (born 1871 or 1872) was a unionist politician in Northern Ireland.

Stevenson worked as a director of a textile company.  In 1940, he was elected to the Senate of Northern Ireland as an Ulster Unionist Party representative.  He served until 1945, then from later in 1945 until 1954.

References

1870s births
Year of death missing
Members of the Senate of Northern Ireland 1937–1941
Members of the Senate of Northern Ireland 1941–1945
Members of the Senate of Northern Ireland 1945–1949
Members of the Senate of Northern Ireland 1949–1953
Members of the Senate of Northern Ireland 1953–1957
Ulster Unionist Party members of the Senate of Northern Ireland